WVIR-CD (channel 35) is a low-power, Class A television station in Charlottesville, Virginia, United States. It is a translator of dual NBC/CW+ affiliate WVIR-TV (channel 29) which is owned by Gray Television. WVIR-CD's transmitter is located on Carters Mountain south of Charlottesville; its parent station maintains studios on East Market Street (US 250 Business) in downtown.

History
The station began its life as charter Pax TV affiliate WADA-LP on August 31, 1998. It first aired an analog signal on UHF channel 55 and later moved to UHF channel 27. In late-March 2005, owner Tiger Eye Broadcasting sold the station to Gray Television who proceeded to change the call letters to WAHU-CA. The station became a Fox affiliate and was integrated with CBS affiliate WCAV (channel 19) and ABC affiliate WVAW-LP (channel 16). Prior to WAHU's affiliation switch, Fox was available on cable from WTTG in Washington, D.C. That station was considered the default affiliate for the market and is still seen on cable due to "significantly viewed" status from the Federal Communications Commission (FCC). (Pax TV's successor, Ion Television, returned to the market on October 1, 2018, on WCAV's fourth subchannel.) Since 2006, the three stations have been the flagship of University of Virginia sports.

On December 28, 2006, WAHU launched its digital signal on UHF channel 40. While providing an over-the-air standard definition Fox feed on its first digital subchannel, the station began airing a dedicated MyNetworkTV channel on a new second one. Following this addition, the station shifted several programs to the digital subchannel. Prior to the addition of WAHU-DT2, the network was added on September 5, 2006 as a secondary affiliation on the main channel. As part of the launch, Comcast moved WTTG from channel 9 to channel 18 in order to give WAHU the lower channel location.

On March 14, 2008, the station changed its call letters to WAHU-LD with "LD" meaning low-power digital. Also on the date, along with other television stations in Virginia, WAHU-LD2 aired the Virginia High School League championship basketball tournament for the first time. On February 18, 2009, it began broadcasting in high definition over-the-air. On March 13 and 14, WAHU-LD2 (and other stations in the state) aired the Virginia High School League basketball championships for a second time. On September 7, 2009, This TV started airing on WAHU-LD2. On January 3, 2011, the station changed its calls again to WAHU-CD with "CD" meaning Class A low-power digital.

In late 2018, WAHU-CD2 ended its affiliation with MyNetworkTV to take MeTV full-time.

Gray announced the sale of WCAV and WVAW-LD to Lockwood Broadcast Group on March 4, 2019. The sale was concurrent with Gray's purchase of rival WVIR-TV from Waterman Broadcasting. WAHU-CD was not included in the sale and would be retained by Gray as a sister station to WVIR-TV.

Gray took WAHU-CD silent on April 1 to begin moving its equipment out of the shared Newsplex facility. The Fox, MeTV, and AccuWeather affiliations were included in the sale to Lockwood and moved to WCAV and WVAW-LD.

As Gray's purchase of WVIR was held up by legal challenges, delaying construction of a new co-located transmitter, WAHU-CD returned to the air with Fox on August 23 with an interim facility from its previous location. Because the Fox feed on WCAV began using virtual channel 27 when WAHU-CD went silent, it began using virtual channel 35.

On October 8, 2019, the station changed its callsign to WVIR-CD when the legal challenges were cleared and the sale to Gray closed. Later that month, it converted to a translator of WVIR-TV. WVIR-CD preserved UHF reception in the core of the market when WVIR-TV moved to VHF channel 2, which is difficult to receive indoors, in 2020.

On September 15, 2022, Grit was added to the channel lineup.

Technical information

Subchannels
This station rebroadcasts the subchannels of full-power WVIR-TV.

Analog-to-digital conversion
WAHU shut down its analog signal, over UHF channel 27, on February 16, 2009. The station "flash-cut" its digital signal into operation UHF channel 40. Through the use of PSIP, digital television receivers display the station's virtual channel as its former UHF analog channel 27.

References

External links

NBC network affiliates
Gray Television
Television channels and stations established in 1998
Low-power television stations in the United States
VIR-CD
1998 establishments in Virginia